The Pacific Media Expo (PMX) is an annual three day multi-genre convention held during October/November at the Sheraton Los Angeles San Gabriel in San Gabriel, California. PMX was created in 2003 by Mike Tatsugawa, founder of Anime Expo. Pacific Media Association, the parent of Pacific Media Expo is based in Los Angeles, California.

Programming
The convention typically offers art exhibitions, artists market, anime music video contest, anime video rooms, autograph sessions, concerts, live performances, exhibit hall, fashion show, gaming tournaments, iron cosplay, masquerade, panel discussions, swap meets, video rooms (animation, Asian cinema, and Korean drama), and workshops.

History
PMX was formed by staff members from several conventions and former staff of Anime Expo after several years of planning and research. The convention was created as a for-profit event due to concerns over the restraints of non-profit status. Miyavi cancelled his appearance at Pacific Media Expo in 2004 due to the lack of an engineer and the convention offered a registration refund. Silver Ash was unable to attend due performer visa backlogs.

Several issues affected the success of the 2004 convention, including the concerts being on a separate day (28th) from the convention (29th-31st), and the concerts and convention having separate tickets. The convention utilized the same space as Anime Expo. Potential attendance was overestimated, as PMX prepared for 10,000, but only had 3,000. Concert turnout was considered a success, but only an estimated 25% attended the convention afterwards. Also complicating the event was the Memorial Day weekend with graduations, proms, and FanimeCon. The convention for 2005 moved to Labor Day with adjustments made to the space required.

Pacific Media Expo did not occur in 2017 due to schedule conflicts with NCAA football and the convention's traditional November date. Pacific Media Expo 2020 was a virtual convention due to the COVID-19 pandemic.

Event history

See also
Anime Expo
List of multigenre conventions

References

External links

Conventions in California
Multigenre conventions
Events in Pasadena, California  
Annual events in Los Angeles County, California
Recurring events established in 2004
2004 establishments in California
Annual events in California
Culture of Pasadena, California
Tourist attractions in Pasadena, California